Brian Follett Walker (born 5 September 1954) is an Australian politician.

Walker was a medical practitioner before entering politics. At the 2021 Western Australian state election, Walker was elected to the Western Australian Legislative Council as a Legalise Cannabis WA member for the East Metropolitan Region. His term commenced on 24 May 2021.

Walker was born in Malaysia to Scottish parents, and was educated at Scotch College, Perth, prior to studying medicine at the University of Dundee.  Since graduating, he has since practiced medicine in Germany, the Soviet Union, the United Kingdom, and Hong Kong, returning to Perth in 2008, to set up a specialist GP practice in the Perth Hills.

Walker has a longstanding commitment to holistic wellness, which continues to strongly influence his approach to both medicine and politics.

References 

Living people
Members of the Western Australian Legislative Council
Legalise Cannabis Western Australia Party members of the Parliament of Western Australia
21st-century Australian politicians
1954 births
Alumni of the University of Dundee
Australian general practitioners
Malaysian emigrants to Australia
People educated at Scotch College, Perth
Australian people of Scottish descent